Marchese Gerolamo (or Girolamo) Theodoli (1677–17 October 1766) was an Italian nobleman and architect, best known for designing the Teatro Argentina in Rome.  He also designed the bell tower for Santa Maria dei Miracoli, the church of Santi Marcellino e Pietro in Rome, the church of San Pietro at Vicovaro, near Tivoli, and the altar of the Immaculate Conception in the Cathedral of Tivoli.

Bibliography 
Spesso, Marco, "Gerolamo Theodoli", in Bulzoni (ed.), La cultura architettonica a Roma nel secolo XVIII (Roma, 1991; br., pp. 244, 16 ill., cm 17x24 - Arte, architettura, urbanistica series), 

1677 births
1766 deaths
18th-century Italian architects
Architects from Rome
Margraves of Italy